Q wave or Q-wave may refer to:
 Love wave in elastodynamics
 the Q segment of the QRS complex in electrocardiography